Nangla is a village in Talwandi Sabo Tehsil of Bathinda District in Punjab. Nangla had a population of 2339 in 2001. Its area is 12.15 km2.

References 

Villages in Bathinda district